Two ships of the United States Navy have been named USS Lardner in honor of James L. Lardner.

She was transferred to the Turkish Navy where she served as Gemlik (D-347).

United States Navy ship names